This is a list of the known snakes of Arizona. The Arizona State Reptile is the Arizona ridge-nosed rattlesnake (Crotalus willardi willardi).

Snakes

Non venomous 

Arizona Milk Snake
 Arizona mountain kingsnake
Arizona Patch-nosed Snake
Blackneck Garter Snake
 Blind snake
 Checkered Garter Snake
 Coachwhip snake (Red Racer)
 Common Kingsnake
 Desert Kingsnake
 Gopher Snake
 Glossy Snake
 King Snake
 Ground Snake
 Desert Rosy Boa Snake
Saddled Leafnose Snake (Phyllorhynchus browni)
 Sonoran Gopher Snake
Spotted Leafnose Snake (Phyllorhynchus decurtatus)
 Long-nosed snake
 Western Hognose Snake

Venomous 
 Arizona coral snake
 Mexican vine snake
Tropical vine snake
 Sidewinder Rattlesnake
 Grand Canyon Rattlesnake
 Arizona Black Rattlesnake
 Great Basin Rattlesnake
 Tiger Rattlesnake
 Hopi Rattlesnake
 Lyre snake
 Mojave Rattlesnake (Crotalus scutulatus)
 Night Snake
 Northern Blacktail Rattlesnake
 Prairie Rattlesnake (Crotalus viridis)
 Arizona ridge-nosed rattlesnake (Crotalus willardi willardi)
 Southwestern Blackhead Snake
 Speckled Rattlesnake (Crotalus mitchelli)
 Western Coral snake (Micruroides euryxanthus)
 Western Diamondback Rattlesnake (Crotalus atrox)
Western Shovelnose Snake
Twin-Spotted Rattlesnake

References 

Snakes
Arizona